Park Road Shopping Center is an open air strip mall located in Charlotte, North Carolina.  It is located northeast of the intersection of Woodlawn Rd. and Park Rd. in the south central part of Charlotte.  Park Road Shopping Center has a nostalgic ambience, which is sustained by the pipe shop, soda shop, shoe repair shop, and many other stores that date back to the Post-World War II baby boom era.

History
Park Road Shopping Center opened up on November 15, 1956 and was Charlotte's very first open area-type shopping mall.  Developed by A.V. Blankenship, it is typical of Mid-Century modern architecture and the  original billboard sign remains today.  When  the mall was first envisioned, it was considered to be a shift in area business development.  At this time period most of the shopping areas were still  located in and around downtown Charlotte.  Meanwhile, more and more people continued to move to the suburbs and outlying areas of the city.  This has been the catalyst that has kept the shopping center successful to this day.  Park Road Shopping Center is a very bustling mall and serves many of the surrounding Charlotte neighborhoods such as Myers Park, Barclay Downs, Parkdale, Colonial Village, Madison Park, Sedgefield, Ashbrook, and Starmount.   In 1967 a local attorney named Porter Byrum bought Park Road Shopping  Center.  On June 16, 2011 Mr. Byrum announced that Park Road Shopping Center would be donated to 3 local colleges (Queens University of Charlotte, Wingate University, and Wake Forest University).   Mr. Byrum had held  ownership of the shopping center for nearly 44 years.  Just one month later these 3 colleges sold the shopping center for $82 million to EDENS, a   shopping center operator and developer. Despite these sudden changes in ownership, it is expected that the shopping center will continue on as is.  It is easy to walk or bike to the Park Road Shopping Center since it lies on the Little Sugar Creek Greenway.  In 2014 the center underwent a renovation. It was painted white, given wooden features, outdoor seating was added and the covered walkways got new lighting and floor treatment.

References

External links
Park Road Shopping Center (official website)
Aerial view of Park Road Shopping Center from Google Maps
Bing Maps birds eye view of the mall

Shopping malls in Charlotte, North Carolina
Shopping malls established in 1956